Kyungnam University (경남대학교; 慶南大學校) is a private university in Changwon, South Gyeongsang Province, South Korea. The university has six colleges (Liberal Arts, Natural Sciences, Education, Economics and Commerce, Law and Politics, and Engineering). Its 15 research institutions (including the Institute for Far Eastern Studies in Seoul) work to facilitate not only individual research but also cooperative partnership activities with academia, industry, and government. The university also has 65 sister universities in 19 different countries. The university specializes in globalization and localization under the university's motto of 'truth, freedom, and creation'.

History
Founded in 1946 as Kookmin College in Seoul, the tumultuous Korean War years created a situation in which it was more advantageous to move south than to stay in the Seoul area. In 1952 Kookmin College was rechristened Haein College and then in 1956 the college relocated to Korea's southern coast and has been in the city of Masan since that time. In 1961 the institution was renamed Masan College.

In 1970, the Hanma foundation took over the college and in 1971 decided to rename the college again, so the signs were changed to read “Kyungnam College.” In 1982 the institution attained university status and the name was officially changed to “Kyungnam University.”

Vision

Founding philosophy 
It has a founding philosophy of fostering human resources necessary for the construction of an independent state by inheriting the spirit of the Provisional Government of the Republic of Korea.

Educational ideology 
Establishing the educational ideology of 'truth, liberty, and creation'

 Truth: By teaching and studying profound and political theories, it means establishing a philosophy of behavior that lives by true reason.
 Liberty: The absolute condition that a university needs to explore and disseminate truth means that it should be free from the demands of state authority and the interests of a particular organization.
 Creation: The process of truth-seeking is the process of creation, meaning the social application of new knowledge to create new cultures and institutional products.

Educational objectives 
The goal of education is to foster "cultured professionals, creators of regional development, and independent people of the world" with the aim of contributing to the development of the country and local communities by fostering creative and professional talents according to educational ideology.

Notable alumni
 Ahn Se-ha, actor
 Koo Jun-yup, singer and member of K-pop dance duo CLON

Faculty, staff, students
Kyungnam University maintains a teaching staff of over 900 professors, lecturers, adjuncts, and instructors. Student enrollment currently stands at more than 15,000.

The university comprises six colleges with 4 undergraduate divisions and 46 departments offering degrees at the bachelor's level, whereas six graduate schools confer a variety of degrees at both the master's and doctoral levels.

References

Further reading
 "Kyungnam University Stands Out among Private Universities in Korea." The Korea Post, vol. 26, no. 11 (November 2013), pp. 26–31. (Accessed January 15, 2015).

External links
Kyungnam University Official website (English)

Universities and colleges in South Gyeongsang Province
Buildings and structures in Changwon